The 2014 Singha Beer Grand Slam of Darts, was the eighth staging of the tournament, organised by the Professional Darts Corporation. The event took place from 8–16 November 2014 at the Wolverhampton Civic Hall, Wolverhampton, England.

Phil Taylor was the defending champion and won the title for the a sixth and final time by defeating Dave Chisnall 16–13 in the final.

In his quarter-final victory over Michael van Gerwen, Belgian player Kim Huybrechts threw a nine-dart finish, only the second in the event's history, and the first ever nine-darter on TV by a Belgian player.

Prize money

Qualifying

Qualifying tournaments
For the first time, winners of the European Tour events were invited to the Grand Slam of Darts.

PDC

BDO

Other qualifiers

Pools

Draw

Group stage

All matches first-to-5/best of 9 legs
NB in Brackets: Number = Seeds; BDO = BDO Darts player; Q = Qualifier
NB: P = Played; W = Won; L = Lost; LF = Legs for; LA = Legs against; +/− = Plus/minus record, in relation to legs; Average – 3-dart average; Pts = Points; Q = Qualified for K.O. phase

Group A

8 November

9 November

10 November

Group B

8 November

9 November

10 November

Group C

8 November

9 November

10 November

Group D

8 November

9 November

10 November

Group E

8 November

9 November

11 November

Group F

8 November

9 November

11 November

Group G

8 November

9 November

11 November

Group H

8 November

9 November

11 November

Knockout stage

Statistics

References

2014
Grand Slam
Grand Slam of Darts
Grand Slam of Darts